China Airlines Flight 831 was a scheduled passenger flight from Kaohsiung in Taiwan to British Hong Kong that was hijacked on March 9, 1978.

Hijacking 
The flight, operated by a Boeing 737-281 registered as B-1870, departed at 16:08 local time and was uneventful until 17:00, when one of the crew members, 34-year-old Shi Mingzhen, broke into the cockpit and demanded the pilots to fly to Mainland China. Captain Gao Zhixian and First Officer Gong Zhongkang (both former Republic of China Air Force pilots) refused the demands and were beaten by Shi. Despite having injuries from the beating, the pilots managed to order an on-board security guard to the cockpit. The guard broke down the cockpit door using a fire extinguisher, shot and killed the hijacker. The flight landed at Kai Tak Airport at 17:20, after which the Airport Security Unit searched the aircraft for potential accomplices and questioned passengers. The pilots were then taken to Queen Elizabeth Hospital due to their injuries.

Aftermath 
The aircraft involved later crashed as Flight 2265 near Penghu Airport, killing all 13 people on board.

References 

Aviation accidents and incidents in 1978
1978 in Taiwan
China Airlines accidents and incidents
Accidents and incidents involving the Boeing 737 Original
Aviation accidents and incidents in Hong Kong
Airliner accidents and incidents caused by hijacking
1978 in Hong Kong